Ronney Householder (May 5, 1908 in Omaha, Nebraska – November 11, 1972 in Detroit, Michigan) was an American race car driver. He raced most of the year, in the Midwest in summer and the West Coast in the winter.

Racing career
Householder was the 1935 Detroit Coliseum midget champion. He won the 1936 and 1937 Turkey Night Grand Prix midget races at Gilmore Stadium in front of over 18,000 fans. The Chicago Shriners built a board track inside the football stadium Soldier Field in 1939. Householder won the track championship against the top drivers in the nation.

Householder raced in the 1937 and 1938 Indianapolis 500s, and finished twelfth and fourteenth respectively. He set a new qualifying record in 1938 at 125.769 mph. The record still stands, as the qualifying distance at the time was 10 laps.

Car builder
After his racing career was completed, Householder worked for Chrysler and Plymouth as a car designer, engineer, builder & development guru. Householder was one of the main members of Chrysler during the 1950s and 1960s. He died of cancer at the age of 64.

Career award
Householder was inducted in the National Midget Auto Racing Hall of Fame in 1984.

Indy 500 results

References

1908 births
1972 deaths
Indianapolis 500 drivers
Sportspeople from Omaha, Nebraska
Racing drivers from Nebraska